Hyptia floridana is a species of ensign wasp in the family Evaniidae. It is found in Central America and North America.

References

Further reading

 

Evanioidea
Hymenoptera of North America
Taxa named by William Harris Ashmead
Insects described in 1901
Articles created by Qbugbot